Separation Road is Swedish singer-songwriter Anna Ternheim's second album, released on 27 September 2006. A limited edition bonus CD, entitled Naked Versions II, was released at the same time. The first single was "Girl Laying Down" (13 September 2006), followed by "Today is a Good Day" (4 December 2006), and "Lovers Dream" (2 April 2007).

Track listing

Track listing for Naked Versions II

Charts

Weekly charts

Year-end charts

References

2006 albums